Diego Alberto Gama García (born 14 January 1996) is a Mexican professional footballer who plays as a forward for Cafetaleros de Chiapas.

Club career

Toluca
Diego began his football career at his hometown team Toluca in 2010. He progressed through the ranks having successful seasons with the affiliate teams until he was called up to the senior team in 2014. He made his first appearance with the first team August 6, 2014 in a Cup match against Mérida coming in as a substitute for Carlos Esquivel at half time, the match ended in a 1–1 draw, with Gama disputing 45' minutes of the game. Four days later he made his league debut with Toluca on August 10, 2014, under coach José Cardozo against Leones Negros coming in as a substitute for Lucas Lobos in the 74' minute of the game, the match ended in a 0–0 draw, with Gama participating in 16 minutes of the game.

Loan to Atlético Madrid
On August 12, 2014, Toluca agreed to loan Diego Gama to Atlético Madrid for one season. He was assigned to play with Atlético Madrid Juvenil A, the Under-19 affiliate at the club, for the 2014-15 season in the División de Honor. Diego made his competitive debut in Europe during the 2014-15 UEFA Youth League against Malmö FF on November 4, 2014. Coming in as a substitute for Roberto Núñez in the 71' minute of the match. Just 8' minutes in Diego managed to score; breaking the tie, and ending the game 2–1 in favor for Atletico Madrid. With this game Atletico advanced to the playoffs. Gama finished the season with a further 6 goals in league play. Atlético did not pick up the purchase option in Gama's contract at the end of the season.

Return to Toluca
After spending one year with Atlético Madrid Juvenil A, Diego Gama returned to Toluca to play in the Liga MX. He was given the number 17 shirt. He made his first return appearance on July 25, 2015, during the season opener against Tigres, coming in as a substitute for Enrique Triverio in the 76th minute of the game, Toluca won the match 1–0.

International career
On his under-20 world cup debut in the 2015 tournament, Gama was sent off in the game for an off-the-ball incident. Mexico lost the match 2–0 to Mali.

Career statistics

Club

References

External links
 
 

1996 births
Living people
Mexico under-20 international footballers
Association football forwards
Deportivo Toluca F.C. players
Potros UAEM footballers
La Piedad footballers
Tlaxcala F.C. players
Cafetaleros de Chiapas footballers
Chihuahua F.C. footballers
Liga MX players
Ascenso MX players
Liga de Expansión MX players
People from Toluca
Footballers from the State of Mexico
Mexican footballers